Pantalones cortos (English: Short pants) is a 1949 Argentine black-and-white film, directed by Leopoldo Torres Ríos and written by him and Leopoldo Torre Nilsson. It was premiered on June 22, 1949.

Cast
 Toscanito …Eduardito
 Pierina Dealessi
 María Concepción César
 Guillermo Pedemonte
 Juan Ricardo Bertelegni
 Rodolfo Zenner
 Mario Baroffio
 Juan Pérez Bilbao
 Jaime Andrada
 Ermete Meliante
 Dante Albarelli
 Margarita Canale
 Arturo Arcari
 Narciso Ibáñez
 Andrés Vázquez
 Betty Denis
 Mary Nelly
 Juan Massey
 Adolfo Demaría
 Agustín Andrades

References

1949 films
1940s Spanish-language films
Argentine black-and-white films
Argentine comedy films
1949 comedy films
1940s Argentine films
Films directed by Leopoldo Torres Ríos